Lecanora cinereofusca is a species of lichen in the family Lecanoraceae. It was described as new to science in 1932 by botanist Adolf Hugo Magnusson.

See also
List of Lecanora species

References

cinereofusca
Lichen species
Lichens described in 1932
Lichens of North America
Lichens of Europe
Taxa named by Adolf Hugo Magnusson